Alexander Jack Robertson (29 May 1909 – 13 March 1939) was an Australian rules footballer who played with Footscray in the Victorian Football League (VFL).

Notes

External links 

1909 births
1939 deaths
Australian rules footballers from South Australia
Western Bulldogs players